Trimezia candida, synonym Neomarica candida, also known as white walking iris, is species of flowering plant. It was first described by Emil Hassler and given the name Neomarica candida by Thomas Archibald Sprague. Trimezia candida belongs to the genus Trimezia and family Iridaceae.

These type of plants are found in Paraguay, Brazil, northeastern Argentina and Uruguay.

Gallery

References

candida
Endemic flora of Brazil
Garden plants
Plants described in 1928